Varna is a village in Marshall County, Illinois, United States. The population was 375 at the 2020 census. It is part of the Peoria Metropolitan Statistical Area.

The village was named for Varna, Bulgaria.

Geography 
Varna is in eastern Marshall County, northeast of the intersection of Illinois Routes 17 and 89. IL 89 passes through the west side of the village as Pine Street, leading north  to Magnolia and south  to La Rose. IL 17 runs along the southern border of the village, about half a mile south of the village center; it leads west  to Lacon, the Marshall county seat, and east  to Wenona.

The village is drained to the west by tributaries of Shaw Creek and to the east by a tributary of Sandy Creek, part of the Illinois River watershed.

 northwest of Varna and within the village's postal zone is the  gated community of Lake Wildwood, which was developed in the 1970s around a man-made  lake on Shaw Creek.  In September 2015, the Illinois Environmental Protection Agency completed a watershed management project to stabilize the source water of Shaw Creek and prevent natural sediment from entering the watershed.

Demographics

As of the census of 2000, there were 436 people, 177 households, and 138 families residing in the village. The racial makeup of the village was 98.85% White, 0.23% African American, 0.46% Native American, and 0.46% from two or more races. Hispanic or Latino of any race were 0.92% of the population.

There were 176 households, out of which 32.2% had children under the age of 18 living with them, 62.1% were married couples living together, 9.6% had a female householder with no husband present, and 22.0% were non-families. 20.3% of all households were made up of individuals, and 11.3% had someone living alone who was 65 years of age or older. The average household size was 2.45 and the average family size was 2.77.

In the village, the population was spread out, with 23.6% under the age of 18, 6.7% from 18 to 24, 26.1% from 25 to 44, 26.4% from 45 to 64, and 17.2% who were 65 years of age or older. The median age was 40 years. For every 100 females, there were 94.6 males. For every 100 females age 18 and over, there were 92.5 males.

The median income for a household in the village was $32,308, and the median income for a family was $36,591. Males had a median income of $37,321 versus $20,694 for females. The per capita income for the village was $15,948. About 3.0% of families and 8.1% of the population were below the poverty line, including 12.5% of those under age 18 and 8.6% of those age 65 or over.

References

Villages in Marshall County, Illinois
Villages in Illinois
Peoria metropolitan area, Illinois